Chichicastenango, also known as Santo Tomás Chichicastenango, is a town, with a population of 71,394 (2018 census), and the municipal seat for the surrounding municipality of the same name in the El Quiché department of Guatemala. The Spanish conquistadors gave the town its name from the Nahuatl name used by their allied soldiers from Tlaxcala: Tzitzicaztenanco, or City of Nettles. Its original name was Chaviar.

Chichicastenango is a K'iche' Maya cultural centre. According to the 2012 census, 98.5% of the municipality's population is indigenous Mayan K'iche. Of the population, 21% speak only K'iche, 71% speak both K'iche and Spanish, and the remaining 8% speak only Spanish.

Market

Chichicastenango hosts market days on Thursdays and Sundays where vendors sell handicrafts, food, flowers, pottery, wooden boxes, condiments, medicinal plants, candles, pom and copal (traditional incense), cal (lime stones for preparing tortillas), grindstones, pigs and chickens, machetes, and other tools.

Among the items sold are textiles, particularly women's blouses. Masks used by dancers in traditional dances, such as the Dance of the Conquest, are also manufactured in Chichicastenango.

Church of Santo Tomás

Next to the market is the 400-year-old church of Santo Tomás. It is built atop a Pre-Columbian temple platform, and the steps originally leading to a temple of the pre-Hispanic Maya civilization remain venerated.  K'iche' Maya priests still use the church for their rituals, burning incense and candles. In special cases, they burn a chicken for the gods. Each of the 18 stairs that lead up to the church stands for one month of the Maya calendar year. Another key element of Chichicastenango is the Cofradia of Pascual Abaj, which is an ancient carved stone venerated nearby and the Maya priests perform several rituals there. Writing on the stone records the doings of a king named Tohil (Fate).

The Chichicastenango Regional Museum lies in its grounds.

In music
At least three songs have been written about the town.
 “Chichicastenango” Xavier Cugat 1937
 "In Chi-Chi Castenango"  Edmundo Ros  Mambo Jambo: Original Recordings 1941-1950
 "In the Land of The Maya" Lennie Gallant In the Land of The Maya

In addition, the character Rosie from Bye Bye Birdie sings sarcastically of being the toast of Chichicastenango.

Geography
Chichicastenango is composed of the municipal seat and 81 rural communities. Nearby village communities include Paquixic (1.0 nm), Chucam (1.0 nm), Chujupen (1.4 nm), Camanibal (2.2 nm), Chontala (2.2 nm) and Chucojom (1.0 nm).

In films

The New Adventures of Tarzan (1935) 

In 1935, the film The New Adventures of Tarzan, was filmed on location in Guatemala, taking advantage of the help from the United Fruit Company and president Jorge Ubico. Chichicastenango was among the locations used during filming.

See also
 
 
 List of places in Guatemala

References

External links

 
 Map with information and pictures of the touristic points of interest in Chichicastenango

 
Municipalities of the Quiché Department